G0612 Xining–Hotan Expressway is a partially completed expressway in that connects Xining, the capital of Qinghai, with Hotan, Xinjiang.

The section near Xining forms a southern beltway around the city. Between Xining and Hotan, it will pass along Huangyuan, Ruoqiang, Qiemo, Minfeng and Yutian.

References 

Chinese national-level expressways
Expressways in Qinghai
Expressways in Xinjiang